Tulay (stylized as TULAy) is a five-track EP by Filipino rapper Gloc-9. It is Gloc-9's third EP after Limang Kanta Lang and Rotonda.

Track listing

References

Gloc-9 albums
2019 EPs